Tyagi is a 1992 Indian Hindi-language action drama film produced and directed by K. C. Bokadia, starring Rajinikanth, Jaya Prada in lead roles, along with Kader Khan, Shakti Kapoor, Gulshan Grover, Prem Chopra. The film is a remake of 1989 Kannada film Deva which Rajinikanth had earlier remade in Tamil in 1991 as Dharma Durai.

Plot

Tyagi is the story of a brother, who gave away almost his entire life for the well being of his siblings, but teaches them a lesson when he finds out the true nature of his brothers. Dharmendra and Hema Malini made a guest appearance.

Shankar, as the eldest son of Chaudhary Ganga Prasad Dayal, has always made sacrifices for his two siblings, Shakti and Prem. He financed them by mortgaging his valuables and property, much to the chagrin of his dad. When Shakti rapes Sujata, and is arrested, Shankar negotiates with Sujata and gets her to withdraw the complaint and marry Shakti. When Shakti, Prem, and Sujata re-locate, the two brothers get involved with smuggler and underworld Don, Dhabla, they end up swindling him. When Dhabla's partner seeks vengeance, Shakti kills him, and Shankar accepts the blame and is sentenced to prison for life, leaving his dad, wife, Parvati and a newborn son to fend for themselves. He is let out after several years for good behavior, returns home to find that their house has been sold by Shakti; his dad has died; Parvati and his son are missing. He does locate Parvati in Bombay, this is when he is told that his son was killed after being chased by Prem and run over by a vehicle. Angered and out of control, he decides to kill them both, but Sujata pleads with him. Now years later, Shankar must again be prepared to make more sacrifices - this time for Shakti's grown daughter, Aarti, who has eloped with Amar, the son of a tailor, Nandlal; as well as rescue Shakti and Prem from Dhabla's wrath - a rescue that may well cost him his life.

Cast
 Rajinikanth as Shankar Dayal 
 Jaya Prada as Parvati Dayal 
 Kader Khan as Chaudhary Ganga Prasad Dayal
 Shakti Kapoor as Shakti Dayal
 Gulshan Grover as Prem Dayal
 Sujata Mehta as Sujata Dayal
 Bhagyashree as Aarti Dayal
 Himalaya Dasani as Amar
 Prem Chopra as Dhabla
 Viju Khote as Gabbar Singh
 Joginder as Jogi
 Tiku Talsania as Nandlal
 Vikas Anand as Kabaddi Announcer

Music
It has seven songs composed by Bappi Lahiri.

References

External links
 

1985 films
1990s Hindi-language films
1992 films
Indian action drama films
Films scored by Bappi Lahiri
Hindi remakes of Kannada films
1990s action drama films
Films directed by K. C. Bokadia
1992 drama films